Christian-Jaque (byname of Christian Maudet; 4 September 1904  – 8 July 1994) was a French filmmaker. From 1954 to 1959, he was married to actress Martine Carol, who starred in several of his films, including Lucrèce Borgia (1953), Madame du Barry (1954), and Nana (1955).

Christian-Jaque's 1946 film A Lover's Return was entered into the 1946 Cannes Film Festival.
He won the Best Director award at the 1952 Cannes Film Festival for his popular swashbuckler Fanfan la Tulipe.  At the 2nd Berlin International Film Festival, he won the Silver Bear award  for the same film. In 1959, he was a member of the jury at the 1st Moscow International Film Festival. 

Christian-Jaque began his motion picture career in the 1920s as an art director and production designer.  By the early 1930s, he had moved into screenwriting and directing.  He continued working into the mid-1980s, though from 1970 on, most of his work was done for television. In 1979, he was a member of the jury at the 11th Moscow International Film Festival.

Christian-Jaque was born in Paris.  He died at Boulogne-Billancourt in 1994.

Selected filmography

Director
 Josette (1937)
 Francis The First (1937)
 The House Opposite (1937)
 Boys' School (1938)
 Rail Pirates (1938)
 Ernest the Rebel (1938)
 First Ball (1941)
 Who Killed Santa Claus? (1941)
 La Symphonie fantastique (1942)
 Carmen (1942)
 Voyage Without Hope (1943)
 Boule de suif (1945)
The Bellman (1945)
 A Lover's Return (1946)
 The Charterhouse of Parma (1948)
 Man to Men (1948)
 Singoalla (1949)
 Lost Souvenirs (1950)
 Barbe-Bleue (1951) and German-language version Bluebeard (1951)
 Adorable Creatures (1952)
 Fanfan la Tulipe (1952)
 Lucrèce Borgia (1953)
 Destinées (1954)
 Madame du Barry (1954)
 If All the Guys in the World (1955)
 Nana (1955)
 Nathalie (1957)
 The Law Is the Law (1958)
 Babette Goes to War (1959)
 Love and the Frenchwoman (segment "Le Divorce") (1960)
 Madame (1961)
 Don't Tempt the Devil (1963)
 The Black Tulip (1964)
 Le repas des fauves (1964)
 Le gentleman de Cocody (1965)
 The Dirty Game (1965)
 The Second Twin (1966) 
 Le Saint prend l'affût (1966)
 Dead Run (1967)
 Emma Hamilton (1968)
 The Legend of Frenchie King (1971)
  (1975)
 Parisian Life (1977)

Art director
 The Great Passion (1928)
 The Wedding March (1929)
 Levy and Company (1930)
 Tenderness (1930)
 The Levy Department Stores (1932)

Actor
 Southern Cross (1932)

References

External links

 

1904 births
1994 deaths
Film directors from Paris
Recipients of the Croix de Guerre 1939–1945 (France)
Chevaliers of the Légion d'honneur
Officers of the Ordre national du Mérite
Commandeurs of the Ordre des Arts et des Lettres
Cannes Film Festival Award for Best Director winners
César Honorary Award recipients
Burials at Père Lachaise Cemetery